Nafetalai 'Feki' N. F. Pouha is an American politician. He served as a Republican member for the 47th district of the Hawaii House of Representatives.

Born in Kahuku, Hawaii, Pouha attended Brigham Young University. He is a Christian. In 2014, Pouha was elected to the Hawaii House of Representatives representing the 47th district; he succeeded Richard Fale. In 2016, Pouha was succeeded by Sean Quinlan. He had earned 49.2 percent and Quinlan had earned 50.8 percent of votes.

References 

Living people
Year of birth missing (living people)
Politicians from Honolulu
Christians from Hawaii
Republican Party members of the Hawaii House of Representatives
21st-century American politicians
Brigham Young University alumni
Asian conservatism in the United States